Tehemton Erach Udwadia (15 July 1934 – 7 January 2023) was an Indian surgeon and gastroenterologist, considered by many as the father of laparoscopic surgery in India. He was a general surgeon at two Mumbai hospitals, Breach Candy Hospital and Hinduja Hospital and was the founder president of the Indian Association of Gastrointestinal Endo-Surgeons. The Government of India awarded him the fourth highest civilian honour of the Padma Shri, in 2006 and the third highest civilian honour of the Padma Bhushan in 2017  for his contributions to Indian medicine.

Biography 
Born in a Parsi family originating from Udvada to Erach Rustomji and Perin Erach on 15 July 1934 in Mumbai, the capital city of the western Indian state of Maharashtra, Udwadia did his early education at St. Mary's School, Mumbai and Wilson College, Mumbai. He graduated in medicine from Mumbai University and started his career as a research fellow at the King Edward Memorial Hospital and Seth Gordhandas Sunderdas Medical College in 1958, where he stayed till 1962. During this period, he studied for the postgraduate degree (MS) at the same institution, securing it in 1960. Moving to Grant Medical College and Sir Jamshedjee Jeejeebhoy Group of Hospitals in 1963, he worked there till 1994 till his superannuation and continued his association with the institution as an emeritus professor. In between, he also worked as a Hunterian Professor of the Royal College of Surgeons of England during 1984–85 and Sir James Ross Lecturer at the Royal College of Surgeons of Edinburgh in 1992.

Udwadia was the founder president of the Indian Association of Gastrointestinal Endo-Surgeons and presided over the association from 1993 to 1998. He has served as the president of the Society of Gastrointestinal Endoscopy of India, Association of Surgeons of India and the Society of Endoscopic and Laparoscopic Surgeons of Asia. He has been the president of the Indian chapter and the World body of the International College of Surgeons. He has published over 90 articles in peer reviewed journals and is the author of two books, Laparoscopic Cholecystectomy and Laparoscopic Surgery in Developing Countries.

Udwadia received the SAGES Millennium Award from the Society of American Gastrointestinal Endoscopic Surgeons in 2000. The same year, he was awarded the Dr. B. C. Roy Award, the highest Indian award in the medical category, from the Medical Council of India. The Indian Association of Gastrointestinal Endo-Surgeons awarded him the Lifetime Achievement Award in 2004. In 2006 he was awarded the civilian award of the Padma Shri from the Government of India

Udwadia died on 7 January 2023, at the age of 88.

References

Further reading 
 
 
Udwadia, Tehemton E. (2021). More Than Just Surgery. Penguin eBury Press. ISBN 9780670096510

1934 births
2023 deaths
Parsi people from Mumbai
Recipients of the Padma Shri in medicine
Medical doctors from Mumbai
Indian gastroenterologists
Indian medical writers
Indian medical academics
Dr. B. C. Roy Award winners
University of Mumbai alumni
Academic staff of the University of Mumbai
20th-century Indian medical doctors
Recipients of the Padma Bhushan in medicine